Pastel azteca is a traditional Mexican dish, known in the United States as tortilla casserole or tortilla pie. The dish is made by alternating layers of gently fried corn tortillas with layers of tomato salsa, sliced poblano chillis, sweetcorn, sliced onion, sour cream and cheese: traditionally Oaxaca or Chihuahua. It is common to add a meat ingredient such as coarsely shredded chicken, ground beef or pork. The pastel azteca is baked in an oven. Part of Mexican culture, it is one of the most widely recognized dishes in Mexico.

References
 Del Castillo, María. (1966). Cocina mexicana. Ed. Olimpo.

External links
recipe

Mexican cuisine
Tortilla-based dishes
Cheese dishes
Casserole dishes